Jaguar, in comics, may refer to:

 Jaguar (Insurgent Comix), a superheroine created by artist Laura Molina
 Jaguar (Archie Comics), a character from Archie Comics revamped by Impact Comics
 :nl:Jaguar_(strip), a Belgian comic designed by Jan Bosschaert on a scenario of Jean Dufaux edited by Casterman

See also
Jaguar (disambiguation)